Albert Hilger (2 May 1839 in Homburg – 18 May 1905 in Possenhofen) was a German pharmacologist and chemist, known for his work in the field of food chemistry.

He worked as a pharmacy assistant in the cities of Mannheim, Karlsruhe and Saarbrücken, and studied mathematics and sciences at the Polytechnic in Karlsruhe. In 1860 he continued his education at the University of Würzburg, receiving his PhD two years later in Heidelberg. Later on, he spent several years as an assistant to chemist Johann Joseph Scherer at Würzburg.

In 1868 he established a private agricultural-chemistry laboratory, and during the following year, obtained his habilitation at Würzburg. In 1872 he became an associate professor of pharmacy and applied chemistry at the University of Erlangen, where in 1875 he attained a full professorship. In 1892 he succeeded Ludwig Andreas Buchner as a professor at the University of Munich.

Selected works 
 Ueber die Verbindungen des Jod mit den Pflanzenalcaloiden; ein Beitrag zum Nachweis der Alcaloide, 1869 –  On the compounds of iodine with plant alkaloids; a contribution to the detection of alkaloids. 
 Vereinbarungen betreffs der Untersuchung und Beurteilung von Nahrungs- und Genussmitteln sowie Gebrauchsgegenständen, 1885 – Agreements involving the inspection and assessment of food products and consumer goods. 
 Vierteljahresschift über die fortschritte auf dem gebiete der chemie der nahrungs- und genussmittel, 1887 – Quarterly on progress in the areas of food and beverage chemistry.
 Studien über die bestimmung des coffeïns in den samen der kaffeepflanze und in den theeblättern, 1897 – Studies on the determination of caffeine in the seeds of the coffee plant, etc.

References 

1839 births
1905 deaths
People from Homburg, Saarland
University of Würzburg alumni
Karlsruhe Institute of Technology alumni
Academic staff of the University of Erlangen-Nuremberg
Heidelberg University alumni
Academic staff of the Ludwig Maximilian University of Munich
German pharmacologists
19th-century German chemists